The Americas Rugby Challenge is an annual international rugby union tournament between the four best nations below the Americas Rugby Championship. It was created by Rugby Americas and features two teams from Sudamérica Rugby and two from Rugby Americas North. It was first contested in 2018, with Colombia winning the inaugural title.

Format

All four nations play each other once in a single-round robin. Every instance of the tournament to date has taken place in one host country, unlike the Americas Rugby Championship in which each country hosts two to three home matches.

Promotion/Relegation

In August of 2019, Chilean Rugby Federation president Cristian Rudhoff confirmed that starting in 2020 the Americas Rugby Challenge will include a promotion/relegation playoff with the Americas Rugby Championship

Additionally, the lower placed North American team in the Americas Rugby Challenge every year faces the winner of the Rugby Americas North Championship in a promotion/relegation playoff.

Teams

Current Teams

Past Teams

 (2018)

Previous Results

References

 
Rugby union competitions for national teams
Rugby union competitions in South America
Rugby union competitions in North America
2018 establishments in South America
Recurring sporting events established in 2018